Gabatha may refer to:

An ancient settlement located near the kibbutz at Gvat
The Greek (Septuagint) name for Bigthan, mentioned in the Book of Esther